In functional analysis and related branches of mathematics, the Banach–Alaoglu theorem (also known as Alaoglu's theorem) states that the closed unit ball of the dual space of a normed vector space is compact in the weak* topology. 
A common proof identifies the unit ball with the weak-* topology as a closed subset of a product of compact sets with the product topology. 
As a consequence of Tychonoff's theorem, this product, and hence the unit ball within, is compact.

This theorem has applications in physics when one describes the set of states of an algebra of observables, namely that any state can be written as a convex linear combination of so-called pure states.

History

According to Lawrence Narici and Edward Beckenstein, the Alaoglu theorem is a "very important result - maybe  most important fact about the weak-* topology - [that] echos throughout functional analysis." 
In 1932, Stefan Banach proved that the closed unit ball in the continuous dual space of any separable normed space is sequentially weak-* compact (Banach only considered sequential compactness). 
The proof for the general case was published in 1940 by the mathematician Leonidas Alaoglu. 
According to Pietsch [2007], there are at least 12 mathematicians who can lay claim to this theorem or an important predecessor to it. 

The Bourbaki–Alaoglu theorem is a generalization of the original theorem by Bourbaki to dual topologies on locally convex spaces. 
This theorem is also called the Banach–Alaoglu theorem or the weak-* compactness theorem and it is commonly called simply the Alaoglu theorem.

Statement

If  is a topological vector space (TVS) then its continuous dual space will be denoted by  where  always holds. 

Proof involving duality theory

If  is a normed vector space, then the polar of a neighborhood is closed and norm-bounded in the dual space. 
Consequently, this theorem can be specialized to:

This is because the unit ball in the norm topology is compact if and only if the space is finite-dimensional (cf. F. Riesz theorem). 
This theorem is one example of the utility of having different topologies on the same vector space.

It should be cautioned that despite appearances, the Banach–Alaoglu theorem does  imply that the weak-* topology is locally compact. 
This is because the closed unit ball is only a neighborhood of the origin in the strong topology, but is usually not a neighborhood of the origin in the weak-* topology, as it has empty interior in the weak* topology, unless the space is finite-dimensional. 
In fact, it is a result of Weil that all locally compact Hausdorff topological vector spaces must be finite-dimensional.

Elementary proof

The following elementary proof does not utilize duality theory and requires only basic concepts from set theory, topology, and functional analysis. 
What is need from topology is a working knowledge of net convergence in topological spaces and familiarity with the fact that a linear functional is continuous if and only if it is bounded on a neighborhood of the origin (see the articles on continuous linear functionals and sublinear functionals for details). 
Also required is a proper understanding of the technical details of how the space  of all functions of the form  is identified as the Cartesian product  and the relationship between pointwise convergence, the product topology, and subspace topologies they induce on subsets such as the algebraic dual space  and products of subspaces such as  
An explanation of these details is now given for readers who are interested. 

Identification of functions with tuples

The Cartesian product  is usually thought of as the set of all -indexed tuples  but, since tuples are technically just functions from an indexing set, it can also be identified with the space  of all functions having prototype  as is now described: 

This is the reason why many authors write, often without comment, the equality 

and why the Cartesian product  is sometimes taken as the definition of the set of maps  (or conversely). 
However, the Cartesian product, being the (categorical) product in the category of sets (which is a type of inverse limit), also comes equipped with associated maps that are known as its (coordinate) . 

The  at a given point  is the function

where under the above identification,  sends a function  to
 
Stated in words, for a point  and function  "plugging  into " is the same as "plugging  into ". 

In particular, suppose that  are non-negative real numbers. 
Then  where under the above identification of tuples with functions,  is the set of all functions  such that  for every  

If a subset  partitions  into  then the linear bijection

canonically identifies these two Cartesian products; moreover, this map is a homeomorphism when these products are endowed with their product topologies. 
In terms of function spaces, this bijection could be expressed as 

Notation for nets and function composition with nets

In the proofs below, this resulting net may be denoted by any of the following notations 
 
depending on whichever notation is cleanest or most clearly communicates the intended information. 

Topology

The set  is assumed to be endowed with the product topology. It is well known that the product topology is identical to the topology of pointwise convergence. 
This is because given  and a net  where  and every  is an element of  then the net  converges in the product topology if and only if

for every  the net  converges in  

where because  and 
 
this happens if and only if 

for every  the net  converges in  

This proof will also use the fact that the topology of pointwise convergence is preserved when passing to topological subspaces. 

Characterization of 

An important fact used by the proof is that for any real  

where  denotes the supremum and  
As a side note, this characterization does not hold if the closed ball  is replaced with the open ball  (and replacing  with the strict inequality  will not change this; for counter-examples, consider  and the identity map  on ). 
 

The essence of the Banach–Alaoglu theorem can be found in the next proposition, from which the Banach–Alaoglu theorem follows. 
Unlike the Banach–Alaoglu theorem, this proposition does  require the vector space  to endowed with any topology. 

Before proving the proposition above, it is first shown how the Banach–Alaoglu theorem follows from it (unlike the proposition, Banach–Alaoglu assumes that  is a topological vector space (TVS) and that  is a neighborhood of the origin). 

The conclusion that the set  is closed can also be reached by applying the following more general result, this time proved using nets, to the special case  and 

For any  let  denote 

To conclude that  it must be shown that  is a linear functional so let  be a scalar and let  
By using  in place of  it follows that each of the following nets of scalars converges in 

Proof that  
Let  be the "multiplication by " map defined by  

Proof that  
Define a net  by letting  for every  
Because  and  it follows that  in  
Let  be the addition map defined by  

which proves that  Because also  it follows that  as desired. 

The lemma above actually also follows from its corollary below since  is a Hausdorff complete uniform space and any subset of such a space (in particular ) is closed if and only if it is complete. 

Because the underlying field  is a complete Hausdorff locally convex topological vector space, the same is true of the product space  
A closed subset of a complete space is complete, so by the lemma, the space  is complete.
 

The above elementary proof of the Banach–Alaoglu theorem actually shows that if  is any subset that satisfies  (such as any absorbing subset of ), then  is a weak-* compact subset of  

As a side note, with the help of the above elementary proof, it may be shown (see this footnote) 
that there exist -indexed non-negative real numbers  such that 

where these real numbers  can also be chosen to be "minimal" in the following sense: 
using  (so  as in the proof) and defining the notation  for any  if
 
then  and for every   
which shows that these numbers  are unique; indeed, this infimum formula can be used to define them. 

In fact, if  denotes the set of all such products of closed balls containing the polar set 
 
then 
 
where  denotes the intersection of all sets belonging to 

This implies (among other things) 
Similarly, because   is also unchanged if  is replaced by its closure in

Sequential Banach–Alaoglu theorem

A special case of the Banach–Alaoglu theorem is the sequential version of the theorem, which asserts that the closed unit ball of the dual space of a separable normed vector space is sequentially compact in the weak-* topology. 
In fact, the weak* topology on the closed unit ball of the dual of a separable space is metrizable, and thus compactness and sequential compactness are equivalent.

Specifically, let  be a separable normed space and  the closed unit ball in  Since  is separable, let  be a countable dense subset. 
Then the following defines a metric, where for any  

Due to the constructive nature of its proof (as opposed to the general case, which is based on the axiom of choice), the sequential Banach–Alaoglu theorem is often used in the field of partial differential equations to construct solutions to PDE or variational problems. 
For instance, if one wants to minimize a functional  on the dual of a separable normed vector space  one common strategy is to first construct a minimizing sequence  which approaches the infimum of  use the sequential Banach–Alaoglu theorem to extract a subsequence that converges in the weak* topology to a limit  and then establish that  is a minimizer of  
The last step often requires  to obey a (sequential) lower semi-continuity property in the weak* topology.

When  is the space of finite Radon measures on the real line (so that  is the space of continuous functions vanishing at infinity, by the Riesz representation theorem), the sequential Banach–Alaoglu theorem is equivalent to the Helly selection theorem.

Consequences

Consequences for normed spaces

Assume that  is a normed space and endow its continuous dual space  with the usual dual norm. 

So if  is infinite dimensional then its closed unit ball is necessarily  compact in the norm topology by F. Riesz's theorem (despite it being weak-* compact).
A Banach space is reflexive if and only if its closed unit ball is -compact; this is known as James' theorem.
If  is a reflexive Banach space, then every bounded sequence in  has a weakly convergent subsequence. 
For example, suppose that  is the space Lp space  where  and let  satisfy 
Let  be a bounded sequence of functions in  
Then there exists a subsequence  and an  such that

Consequences for Hilbert spaces

In a Hilbert space, every bounded and closed set is weakly relatively compact, hence every bounded net has a weakly convergent subnet (Hilbert spaces are reflexive).
As norm-closed, convex sets are weakly closed (Hahn–Banach theorem), norm-closures of convex bounded sets in Hilbert spaces or reflexive Banach spaces are weakly compact.
Hence bounded sequences of operators have a weak accumulation point. 
As a consequence,  has the Heine–Borel property, if equipped with either the weak operator or the ultraweak topology.

Relation to the axiom of choice and other statements

The Banach–Alaoglu may be proven by using Tychonoff's theorem, which under the Zermelo–Fraenkel set theory (ZF) axiomatic framework is equivalent to the axiom of choice. 
Most mainstream functional analysis relies on ZF + the axiom of choice, which is often denoted by ZFC. 
However, the theorem does  rely upon the axiom of choice in the separable case (see above): in this case there actually exists a constructive proof. 
In the general case of an arbitrary normed space, the ultrafilter Lemma, which is strictly weaker than the axiom of choice and equivalent to Tychonoff's theorem for compact  spaces, suffices for the proof of the Banach–Alaoglu theorem, and is in fact equivalent to it.

The Banach–Alaoglu theorem is equivalent to the ultrafilter lemma, which implies the Hahn–Banach theorem for real vector spaces (HB) but is not equivalent to it (said differently, Banach–Alaoglu is also strictly stronger than HB). 

Compactness implies convex compactness because a topological space is compact if and only if every family of closed subsets having the finite intersection property (FIP) has non-empty intersection. 
The definition of convex compactness is similar to this characterization of compact spaces in terms of the FIP, except that it only involves those closed subsets that are also convex (rather than all closed subsets).

See also

Notes

Proofs

Citations

References

  
 
  
   See Theorem 3.15, p. 68.

Further reading

  
  

Articles containing proofs
Compactness theorems
Functional analysis
Topological vector spaces
Linear functionals